Nesquik is a brand of food products made by Swiss company Nestlé. In 1948, Nestlé launched a drink mix for chocolate-flavored milk called Nestlé Quik in the United States; this was released in Europe during the 1950s as Nesquik.

Since 1999, the brand has been known as Nesquik worldwide. Today, the Nesquik name appears on a wide range of products, including breakfast cereals, powdered mixes for flavored milk, syrups, ready-to-drink products, candy bars, Fondue fountains, Hot chocolate mix, and more.

History

Nesquik began as a chocolate powdered flavoring mix in the United States in 1948, as Nestlé Quik. In the 1950s, it was launched in Europe as Nesquik. In countries with the Quik term (including the U.S., Canada, Mexico, and Australia, where it was originally marketed under the name Nestlé's Quik), the name was changed to the worldwide brand Nesquik in 1999. The same year, Cereal Partners Worldwide introduced Nesquik Cereal, a breakfast cereal that "turns milk into chocolate milk", which is similar to Cocoa Puffs. Nesquik syrup products were introduced in 1981 and ready-to-drink products were introduced in 1984.

On 8 November 2012, Nestlé USA issued a voluntary recall of limited quantities of Nesquik Chocolate Powder made and sold in the United States. These that were recalled were of the 10.9-, 21.8-, and 40.7-ounce tins. This recall only affected the chocolate variety; it did not affect the other varieties of the mix or any other Nesquik products. This was the first known recall of a Nesquik product. These tins were taken off the market after Nestlé was informed via a supplier, Omya Inc. that it had issued a recall of certain lots of one of its own products, calcium carbonate for Salmonella contamination. The affected Nesquik chocolate mix was produced during early October 2012. All affected products had an expiration date of Best Before October 2014. Nestlé issued a statement on the recall stating, "We apologize to our consumer and sincerely regret this incident."

On 1 April 2013, the official Facebook page of Nesquik USA posted a photo on their page depicting a broccoli-flavored ready-to-drink flavor of Nesquik. However, upon closer inspection of the photo, there was a notice in the lower-left corner that it was not an actual Nestlé product. Nesquik USA announced later in the same day that it was an April Fool's joke.

In January 2017, Nestlé food scientists outlined a strategy to reformulate their drink mix to remove over half of the sugar content, citing consumer backlash against sweetened mixes and beverages.

Products

Mixes

 Nesquik Chocolate Powder was introduced in 1948.
 Nesquik Banana Powder was introduced in 1954.
 Nesquik Strawberry Powder was introduced prior to 1960.
 Nesquik Vanilla Powder was introduced in 1979, but this was discontinued in 2006 due to low sales.
 Additional powder flavors have been introduced, but discontinued: Cherry (1989–1995), Mango (1991–2000), Cream (1997), Triple Chocolate (2002–2006), Honey (2001–2006), Crème Soda (sold in South Africa until 2015), Caramel, Cookies & Cream.

Ingredients
The ingredients of the "classic" chocolate powder are:
Sugar
Cocoa powder processed with alkali
Soy lecithin
Carrageenan
Salt
Natural flavor
Spice
Vitamins and minerals:
Sodium ascorbate (vitamin C)
Ferric pyrophosphate (iron)
Niacinamide
Zinc oxide
Thiamin hydrochloride
Copper gluconate
Manganese sulfate
Biotin

Syrups
Nesquik chocolate syrup was introduced in 1981. Strawberry was added in 1989. Vanilla was added in Canada in 2021. Mixed flavors such as Strawberry Banana and Chocolate Caramel have also been produced.

Ready-to-drink
Not including refrigerated Nesquik, which is made by Saputo Dairy.
 Nestlé introduced ready-to-drink Nesquik (Quik at the time) Chocolate Milk in 1983. Strawberry was added in 1987, and Banana was added in 1990. Vanilla, Double Chocolate, and Banana-Strawberry are also available.
 Fat-Free Nesquik Chocolate Milk was introduced in 1998.
 Nesquik Milkshakes come in Chocolate and Strawberry. Chocolate Caramel was introduced in 2007.
 Nestlé introduced Nesquik "Magic" Straws in 2008

The ready-to-drink versions of Nesquik ended production in 2009 in the U.K.

Ingredients
The ingredients of the ready-to-drink chocolate milk are:
Reduced fat milk with vitamin A palmitate and vitamin D3 added
High fructose corn syrup
Less than 2% of:
Cocoa powder processed with alkali
Nonfat milk
Sugar
Calcium carbonate
Natural and artificial flavors
Guar gum
Salt
Carrageenan

Cereal

Nesquik Cereal is a breakfast cereal first manufactured by Cereal Partners in 1999. Nesquik Cereal is most similar to General Mills' Cocoa Puffs; it is also their most direct competitor.

Nesquik Cereal is sold in dozens of countries worldwide such as the U.K., Sweden, Canada, Mexico, France, and Hong Kong. It is sold throughout Europe, Africa, Asia, Oceania, the Middle East, South America, and parts of North America. It is currently available in 43 countries. Most Nesquik Cereal is manufactured in France by Cereal Partners.

It is also available in two other varieties: CioccoMilk (a filled square-shaped chocolate puffed rice-and-corn cereal), and Duo (the original variety, but with white chocolate flavored rice-and-Puffcorn. A third variety was introduced in certain regions of EMEA and Kerela called DittoMilk but was discontinued.)

Other

 Nesquik chocolate candy bars were originally known as Nestlé Quik candy bars before the 1999 name change.
 A Nesquik Chocolate Fondue Fountain was made by Smart Planet Home, using the Nesquik name and logo under license.
 A Nesquik flavor of Nestlé hot cocoa mix features bunny-shaped marshmallows and advertises 38% more calcium than regular hot cocoa.
 Nesquik Chocolate Pots, a chocolate fromage frais range was available in the U.K..
 Nesquik is available for the Dolce Gusto system.
 Nesquik is available as a flavor of Ice-Screamers frozen novelties made by Nestlé.
 Nesquik created a Nesquik-powered race car for advertising and marketing purposes.
 Nesquik Milk Slice, a sponge cake with chocolate flavor yogurt filling is available in the U.K.

Advertising campaigns
Nesquik has had hundreds of various advertising campaigns over its long history. It has had ads from print ads to ads at the Tour de France, and Olympics in recent years. It has been advertised with close to one dozen mascots.

Jimmy Nelson, Danny O'Day, and Farfel
In 1955, Nestlé hired ventriloquist Jimmy Nelson to do its advertising on children's television programming. Nelson's dummy Danny O'Day would say that Quik "makes milk taste...like a mill-ion" (dollars). Danny and a dog named Farfel would finish the commercials by singing Nestlé's brand-new signature jingle:

Danny: N-E-S-T-L-E-S,
Nestlé's makes the very best...
Farfel: Choc-'late

Farfel would finish with the sound of his jaw snapping shut. This effect was accidentally invented when Nelson's sweaty finger (a result of nervousness) slipped off the mouth control during his first audition in front of the Nestlé executives. This would normally be a serious technical mistake for a ventriloquist, but they actually liked it so much that they insisted that Nelson keep it in. Nelson performed the jingle that way for 10 years.

Nesquik Bunny (a.k.a. Quicky)

A cartoon Quik Bunny first appeared on the cans of the strawberry flavor when it was introduced. Later, an anthropomorphic animated bunny wearing a large red "Q" on a collar-like necklace, was introduced in television commercials as the new chocolate Quik mascot. He debuted in 1960 and first appeared in his first TV commercial in 1973. The character is voiced by Barry Gordon.

He sings Nesquik's most famous jingle in a rock-and-roll rhythm:

Then he vocalizes only four notes "oh-do-be-oh" and instead of vocalizing the fifth note which is "doh", he immediately sucks all of his drink down through a straw, then finishes the rhyme by forlornly intoning, "That's the saddest sound I know."

In the U.S. by 1999, the Quik Bunny was renamed the Nesquik Bunny and his "Q" changed to an "N" when the brand name was changed. He appears on the packaging and marketing and has appeared in the product's television commercials. The artist who made the redesign of the Bunny for its global implantation in the '90s was the cartoonist Ramon Maria Casanyes. In France, Italy, and Canada, he is known as Quicky the Nesquik Bunny. In Spain, there was no mascot prior to the introduction of Quicky in 1990/1991.

The Nesquik Bunny is also featured on the packaging and advertisements for other Nesquik products.

Appearances in other media

 The Quik Bunny was parodied in the animated television series Drawn Together episode "Unrestrainable Trainable" where he was found engaging in sexual activity with three of the main characters and stunned at the contents of his "chocolate milk".
 A promotional comic with Superman.

 The Adventures of Quik Bunny comic.
 A Quik Bunny balloon had been a staple of the Macy's Thanksgiving Day Parade from 1988 until 1999.

Groquik (Quikáras)
France and Greece first had another mascot for Nesquik, which was a giant fat yellow hippopotamus-like cartoon creature with a deep voice, wearing a hat with red and white stripes, called Groquik—a variation of Gros Quik ("Fat Quik"), created by Gilbert Mast and puppeteered by Yves Brunier. In Greece, the mascot was called Κουικάρας (or Quikáras—English: "Big Quik") He was later replaced by Quicky, much to the discontent of fans who protested against the lack of a sympathetic character and the Americanism.

The character was created in 1978. His first appearance was in the French magazine, Téléjunior in April 1979. The designer of the character was Gilbert Mas. In the French advertisements where Groquik was depicted; he was a puppet character portrayed by renowned French puppeteer Yves Brunier, who manufactured and portrayed puppets as a ventriloquist. He has also created famous characters such as Casimir, L'Île aux enfants, and worked on The Muppet Show.

The Greek character's catchphrase was: "I have a craving for Neskouik!"  (at the time, this translated into Quik, as the name had not yet been changed) The French character's catchphrase was the same, but in French. These catchphrases were passed on to their successor, the Nesquik Bunny. In the Greek television ads, Kouikaras would chase after thieves who kidnapped children, after trying to steal their Quik; the children refused to give their Quik to the thieves, so the thieves stole the children along with the Quik. Kouikaras would catch the thieves, saved the children, and returned the Quik to the children. Over the years, this basic advertising format spawned various variations, such as ads where pirates stole Quik and kidnapped children, and they were saved by Kouikaras; another version followed the basic format, but was instead set in space. Many other versions followed this format, and some still follow this format today with the Nesquik Bunny.

The last ad with Kouikaras (which was played in Greece) showed a train at a train station soon to be leaving the station. Kouikaras was at the station, and dozens of children at the station said goodbye to Kouikaras, soon after he boarded the train, and it began to leave the station. As it left the station, and the children waved goodbye, thieves once again stole the Quik, and Quicky the bunny (who had been at the station the entire time) caught the thieves and returned the Quik back to the children.

In 2001, Nesquik launched a website, which was dedicated to Groquik. The website contained old Nesquik commercials and advertisements, contests, e-cards, logos, and more.

Cangurik

In Portugal, the mascot was a kangaroo, Cangurik, which was replaced by Quicky in 1989/1990. The song "Cangurik" was recorded by Suzy Paula in 1982. Joel Branco recorded "Uma Árvore, Um Amigo", with Cangurik on the cover, in 1984. "Amigos do cangurik" (1986) was a collection of trading cards. There was a club named "Clube do Cangurik".

Mr. Nesquik

In Italy, before the arrival of Quicky, the mascot was an anthropomorphized box of Nesquik called Mr. Nesquik. Especially in the 1980s, he represented a popular and easily recognizable advertising character thanks to TV commercials (featuring an iconic jingle based on the music of Oh! Susanna), press advertisements (most notably on Topolino comic books), and to the many complimentary gadgets included with every box of Nesquik powdered chocolate throughout the years, all bearing his image. Mr. Nesquik made his final appearance around 1990, concomitant with Quicky's introduction, for the promotion of a new gadget, the Volaquik, already depicting the latter character, making for a symbolic relay between the two mascots.

Nesquik Cereal

Nesquik Cereal is advertised in the 43 countries in which it is sold. It is mainly marketed via television, though there have been several online and print ads for the product. All ads for the cereal tend to include the Nesquik Bunny.

2012–2013 attempted TV ad ban in England

The attempted ban revolved around a Nesquik chocolate powder TV ad, created by Momentum London, which attracted five complaints to the Advertising Standards Authority. The ad for Nesquik chocolate milkshake stated: "You know, kids only grow up once, which is why they pack their days full of the good stuff. So start theirs with a tasty glass of Nesquik at breakfast. It has essential vitamins and minerals to help them grow and develop, because all this laughing and playing can be hard work."

An animation showed the ingredients "Vitamins D, B & C", "Iron", and "Magnesium" adjacent to a glass of the product, mixed with milk. On-screen text during the ad read, "Enjoy Nesquik as part of a balanced diet and healthy lifestyle".

Some consumers were angered, complaining the ad encouraged poor nutritional habits, as the advertisement had suggested that the product was suitable to give for breakfast to children on a daily basis. Five of them reported the advertisement to Ofcom. Clearcast, the agency that regulates television advertisements, said that it understood that the amount of sugar that is in a single glass of prepared chocolate Nesquik is "well within" the World Health Organisation's guidelines for daily sugar consumption.

To support its case and defense, Nesquik commented on the ad's reference to iron, magnesium Vitamin B, Vitamin C, and Vitamin D. It said that health claims for these micronutrients, in relation to growth and development and maintenance of bones and teeth, had been positively tested by the authorities. Nestlé also said that the benefits of drinking milk were well known and that Nesquik was suitable to be consumed once a day, as part of a balanced diet and Health promotion.

The ASA ruled in favor of Nestlé, saying that it noted that Nestlé provided nutritional information on its packaging and website. Furthermore, it said it did not consider that the level of sugar in the product was so high as to preclude sensible daily consumption. The ASA ruled that further action was not necessary.

In popular culture
 
 Southern Baptist minister and comedian Reverend Grady Nutt told a joke in his stand-up act in which a minister, possessing a suitably charismatic voice, could read the ingredients off a box of Nestlé's Quik, putting the proper meaning and interpretation into words like niacin, thiamine, and riboflavin, "and people would stand weepin' and volunteerin' for foreign missions!"
 In "The Launch Acceleration" episode of the fifth season of the TV series The Big Bang Theory, it was revealed that Strawberry Quik (along with Pepto-Bismol) is the favorite pink fluid of Dr. Sheldon Cooper in a "hot date" with Dr. Amy Farrah Fowler, as the latter attempts to transfer his attachment to several items towards her.
 In Disney's 2012 film Wreck-It Ralph, the Nesquik chocolate milk mix appears when Fix-It Felix and Sergeant Calhoun fall from a double-stripe in Sugar Rush. The sign in the mix said "Nesquik Sand" (a pun on the word "quicksand".)
 In the 140th episode of Epic Meal Time, the cast of the Canadian web series created a chocolate-filled breakfast with Nesquik-covered bacon.
 Tyler Zetting, the starting goalie for Western Washington University's men's hockey team, said that he made a promise early in their team's season. "I don't know why I said this, but I promised the whole team Nesquik if we won the national championship", he reportedly said. After each win for the team, they would reportedly chant: "One game closer to Nesquik." After they won the National Associated of Intercollegiate Hockey Championships in Buffalo, NY on 17 March, Zetting said, "The first thing we chanted after we won, as we were taking our pictures, the whole team started chanting, 'Nesquik,'" Zetting said. "Everyone in that rink was like, 'What are they saying?' And I had to buy everyone Nesquik."
 A parody of Groquik appeared in episode 7 of Les Kassos, in which he does a poor job at hiding his racism.

See also

 Milo (drink)
 Cola Cao
 Ovaltine
 Carnation Instant Breakfast
 Nescafe

References

External links

 

Nestlé cereals
Nestlé brands
Products introduced in 1948
Instant foods and drinks
Chocolate drinks
Powdered drink mixes
Swiss brands
Brand name chocolate